Cannibal Island may refer to:

 Cannibal Island (Manitoba), a Canadian island northwest of the Sandy Islands in Lake Winnipeg
 Fiji, previously known as the Cannibal Isles
 Nazino Island, an island in Ob, Russia, where an infamous GULAG prison camp was situated
 Pelegosto or Cannibal Island, a fictional island in the movie Pirates of the Caribbean: Dead Man's Chest